Portrayals of lesbian, gay, bisexual and transgender (i.e., LGBT) characters or themes within South Korean film and television make up a relatively small part of the overall body of South Korean motion picture media. The topic has consistently generated discussions both in academia and in the public LGBT movements. As the South Korean LGBT rights movement emerged in the 1990s, film portrayals of queer characters and non-heterosexual relationships grew more common. South Korea has historically not been an LGBT-affirming country, which bleeds into the culture, justice system and general public sense. However, recent study conducted in Chonnam National University states that the attitudes toward homosexuality are becoming increasingly positive.

With the increase of social media, the public media plays one of many active players in the cultural creation and consumption as well as the way narratives are created and shared. The cinema and dramas in South Korea especially in regards to LGBT representation has steadily increased over the years. It has also been documented that the queer movement activism and the queer cinema had close connection. One of the examples of this is the Korean Queer Film Festival that began its efforts in the mid-1990s with its first opening in 1998.

Beginning in 1945, around the time of the Korean War, up until the present day, LGBT representation in the media has changed and has also created discourses both within academia and every day lives.

History of LGBT Media in South Korea 
The LGBT representation in South Korean media has evolved and changed throughout time. Efforts from groups such as the Rainbow Foundation or Chingusai, not only changed the atmosphere and attitudes from the public, but also changed the media industry in South Korea. According to Pil Ho Kim and C.Colin Singer, the history and progression of the LGBT representation in South Korean films and dramas can be divided into three separate waves. The first period is the Invisible Age (1945 to 1997) that is followed by the Camouflage Age (1998 to 2004) and the last period is known as the Blockbuster Age (2005 to 2010). Pil Ho Kim is currently an assistant professor at Ohio State University who specializes in Korean society and culture. C. Colin Singer was an academic at Ewha Womans University during the process of this literature.

Invisible Age (1945–1997) 
Kim and Singer describe the period between 1945 and 1997 as the Invisible Age. The word invisible does not necessary translate to the lack of queer films; there were a few films that incorporated LGBT themes to varying levels. The films that were released during this time period are The Pollen of Flowers (1972), Ascetic: Women and Women (1976), Sabangji (1988) and Broken Branches (1995).

These films used different approaches and displayed various levels of LGBT representation, but they all fall under the Invisible Age because of their lack of publicity and fame. For example, The Pollen of Flowers is composed of many unprecedented elements such as violence, which steered the conversation away from homosexuality themes in the films. In a different light, Ascetic: Women and Women showcased erotic and sexual elements that featured lesbian storyline under a more simplistic or basic narratives. A Korean LGBT magazine named Buddy later categorized Ascetic: Women and Women as the first lesbian film, but this effort was still "invisible" to the larger public sphere due to the fact that Ascetic was seen as an erotic film. Around this time, "Ero" has evolved to a prominent genre where films that embraced sexuality and intimacy fell under this genre that was associated with words like underground or unofficial.

Sabangji is another example of the genre of "ero" powerfully overshadowing or masking the LGBT themes in films. Lastly, Broken Branches was the first out of these films to gather some fame out of the invisibility. However, this film was denied from the main activists of the LGBT movement due to its overarching narrative of portraying queerness a consequential result of patriarchy and Confucianism. For all these reasons above, these films were invisiblized by South Korean society as a whole and therefore symbolized the Invisible Age of LGBT representation in South Korean media.

Camouflage Age (1998–2004) 
Continuing with Kim and Singer's categorizing, the time period between 1998 and 2004 is referred to as the Camouflage Age. During this time period, the cinematic representation of LGBT communities increased in general. The films of this era mostly portrayed queerness in the background while main themes overshadowed queerness of the film. This was used as a strategy to strike a balance between making the film enticing while not entirely controversial. Some examples of these successful films include Memento Mori (1999) and Bungee Jumping of Their Own (2001).

Memento Mori is a horror movie about a lesbian couple in an all-girl high school. The plot continues with the couple enduring terrible bullying which results in one of the girls committing suicide. After the tragic incident, horror element begins to surface as the ghost appears and haunts the school. Not only does the horror genre along with the revenge trope successfully mask the lesbian theme within the film but also creates an avenue that allows for the audience to empathize with the lesbian couple.

Bungee Jumping of Their Own shows a man who lost his girlfriend in a tragic accident. Later in the film, the main character begins noticing his lost girlfriend's soul reincarnated in one of his male students. The homosexuality is only pursued because of the pre-existing heterosexual love that the main character treasures and longs for. This film raised a lot of voices both in favor and against the message of the film. Putting this sexuality politic aside, this film is the embodiment of the Camouflage Age in its masking of the queerness under elements that justifies and/or tolerates the themes.

The conversation of the Camouflage Age becomes more complex with the voices of Korean gay activists in Korea under organizations such as Chingusai or Handonghyop. During this era, some activists have called out against the masking and promoted the message that a gay man is no different than a straight man. These activists have stated that these masking perpetuates a message that deems heterosexuality as the "normal" while any deviance would be seen evil. These activists partnered with smaller film companies to produce films that portrayed LGBT relationships just like any other relationships that are portrayed in genres of romance comedy. Others voiced more in favor of the masking strategy under the Camouflage Age stating that this act of "masking" allowed queerness to become depoliticized and therefore allowed in the public sphere. Just like this, the Camouflage Age was a time when films were at the center of these crucial conversations among the LGBT movement in South Korea. Some other films during this time period included Bongja (2000), Flower Island (2001), Desire (2002), Wanee and Junah (2002) and Road Movie (2002).

It is also worthwhile to note the coming-out of a Korean celebrity, Hong Suk Chon, on September 9, 2000, under this Camouflage Era. Harisu also appeared on March, 2001 with her famous commercial where she openly shared her experience as a trans woman. These two figures symbolized and sparked conversations of LGBT themes within the media industry.

Blockbuster Age (2005 – early 2010s) 
Considering the passage of a historic anti-discrimination bill that includes sexual orientation, the general atmosphere and the media was shifting. This age can also easily be described by the sheer amount of opposition against the LGBT community in the public space. The Blockbuster Age was the era were LGBT representation as well as sexuality in general was more explicitly adopted and this remains salient to this day.

One of the most notable shifts during this era was the use of LGBT themes in more mainstream Korean dramas. LGBT themes began surfacing within dramas such as The First Shop of Coffee Prince (2007) and Personal Taste (2008), but really surfaced fully in Life is Beautiful (2010).

Besides these dramas, the most well known LGBT film in the mainstream Korean media was the King and the Clown (2005). This movie sold more than twelve million tickets, which was marked as one of the great successes in the Korean film industry. This film sparked a new narrative of the "flower boy" that showcased the visually attractive notion of a gay man. Jungmin Kwon, a film professor in Portland State University, talks about the phenomenon of straight women fantasizing over gay bodies for these reasons and attributes The King and the Clown as one of the factors. Films such as Antique (2008) and A Frozen Flower (2008) also played on the similar element of "pretty boys" within a gay context.

Examples of South Korean queer cinema 
Below is a list of some of the films and television series that have had LGBT themes:

Film

Television

References